Sir Henry Ernest Gascoyne Bulwer,  (11 December 1836 – 30 September 1914), the nephew of Sir Henry Lytton Bulwer and brother to Edward Earle Gascoyne Bulwer, was a British colonial administrator and diplomat.

Bulwer was educated at Charterhouse School and Trinity College, Cambridge. Administrative and diplomatic posts held include:
 1860–1864 – British Resident in Kythira in the Ionian Islands under the Lord High Commissioner, Sir Henry Knight Storks.
 1865 – Secretary to his uncle, the British Ambassador to the Ottoman Empire in Constantinople.
 1866 – Receiver-General of Trinidad.
 1867–1869 – Administrator of the Government of Dominica.
 1871–1875 – Governor of Labuan and Consular-General in Borneo
 1875–1880 – Lieutenant Governor of the Colony of Natal.
 1882–1885 – Governor of the Colony of Natal and Special Commissioner for Zulu Affairs.
 1886–1892 – High Commissioner in Cyprus.

Bulwer was appointed to the Order of St Michael and St George, as Companion in 1864, Knight Commander in 1874, and as Knight Grand Cross in 1883.

Commemoration
The town of Bulwer in Natal, South Africa was named after him.

While Governor of Labuan he presented the type specimen of Bulwer's pheasant (Lophura bulweri) to the British Museum, a bird consequently named after him.

The author H Rider Haggard dedicated his novel Marie to Sir Henry Bulwer.

References

External links

19th-century British diplomats
1836 births
1914 deaths
Alumni of Trinity College, Cambridge
British Cyprus people
British Trinidad and Tobago people
British Dominica people
Governors of Natal
Knights Grand Cross of the Order of St Michael and St George
People educated at Charterhouse School
People from British Borneo
United States of the Ionian Islands people